Fon is spoken in Benin, Nigeria, Togo, Ghana and Gabon by approximately 1.7 million speakers, and is the language of the Fon people. Like the other Gbe languages, Fon is an isolating language with an SVO basic word order.

Cultural and legal status 
In Benin, French is the official language, while Fon and other indigenous languages, including the Yom and Yoruba languages, are classified as national languages.

Grammar

Dialects
The standardized Fon language is part of the Fon cluster of languages inside the Eastern Gbe languages. Hounkpati B Christophe Capo groups Agbome, Kpase, Gun, Maxi and Weme (Ouémé) in the Fon dialect cluster, although other clusterings are suggested. Standard Fon is the primary target of language planning efforts in Benin, although separate efforts exists for Gun, Gen, and other languages of the country.

To date, there are about 53 different dialects of the Fon language spoken throughout Benin.

Phonology

Vowels 
Fon has seven oral vowel phonemes and five nasal vowel phonemes.

Consonants 

Tone 
Basic disyllabic words have all four possibilities: –, –, –, and –.

In longer phonological words, such as verb and noun phrases, a high tone tends to persist until the final syllable; if that syllable has a phonemic low tone, it becomes falling (high–low). Low tones disappear between high tones, but their effect remains as a downstep. Rising tones (low–high) simplify to  after  (without triggering downstep) and to  before .

{|class="wikitable IPA"
|-
| / xʷèví-sà-tɔ́||é ||kò ||xɔ̀ ||àsɔ̃́ || wè /
|-
|[ xʷèvísáꜜtɔ́ ‖ ||é ||kó ||ꜜxɔ̂ | || àsɔ̃́ ||wê ‖ ]
|-
| fish-sell-aɡent||s/he |||| buy ||crab ||two
|}

"The fishmonger, she bought two crabs"

In Ouidah, a rising or falling tone is realized as a mid tone. For example,  'we, you', phonemically high-tone  but phonetically rising because of the voiced consonant, is generally mid-tone  in Ouidah.

Orthography
The Fon alphabet is based on the Latin alphabet, with the addition of the letters Ɖ/ɖ, Ɛ/ɛ, and Ɔ/ɔ, and the digraphs gb, hw, kp, ny, and xw.

Tone marking 
Tones are marked as follows:

 Acute accent marks the rising tone: xó, dó
 Grave accent marks the falling tone: ɖò, akpàkpà
 Caron marks falling and rising tone: bǔ, bǐ
 Circumflex accent marks the rising and falling tone: côfù
 Macron marks the neutral tone: kān

Tones are fully marked in reference books, but not always marked in other writing. The tone marking is phonemic, and the actual pronunciation may be different according to the syllable's environment.

Sample text 
From the Universal Declaration of Human Rights

Translation
Whereas recognition of the inherent dignity and of the equal and inalienable rights of all members of the human family is the foundation of freedom , justice and peace in the world ,

Use 
Radio programs in Fon are broadcast on ORTB channels.

Television programs in Fon is shown on the La Beninoise satellite TV channel.

French used to be the only language of education in Benin, but in the second decade of the twenty first century, the government is experimenting with teaching some subjects in Benin schools in the country's local languages, among them Fon.

Machine translation efforts 
There is an effort to create a machine translator for Fon (to and from French), by Bonaventure Dossou (from Benin) and Chris Emezue (from Nigeria). Their project is called FFR. It uses phrases from Jehovah's Witnesses sermons as well as other biblical phrases as the research corpus to train a Natural Language Processing (NLP) neural net model.

Notes

References

Bibliography

External links

 A Facebook application to use and learn the Fon language, developed by Jolome.com
 The first blog totally in Fongbe. An access to a Fongbe forum is given
 Journal of West African Languages: Articles on Fon
 Manuel dahoméen : grammaire, chrestomathie, dictionnaire français-dahoméen et dahoméen-français, 1894 by Maurice Delafosse at the Internet Archive (in French)

Gbe languages
Languages of Benin
Fon people